Syneora euboliaria is a moth of the family Geometridae first described by Francis Walker in 1860. It is found in Australia.

The adult moths of this species are brown with a number of darker zigzag lines on each wing. The wingspan is about 3.5 cms. 

The males have feathery antennae, and the females have thread-like antennae.

References

Boarmiini